Nepal played their first Twenty20 International match against Hong Kong on 16 March 2014, and these records date from that match.

Listing criteria 

In general, the top five are listed in each category (except when there is a tie for the last place among the five, in which case, all the tied record holders are noted).

The name of the players who have played at least one match in the last or ongoing series/tournament has been marked in bold.

Team records

Overall record

Team wins, losses, draws and ties

Team scoring records

Highest innings totals 
The highest innings total scored in T20Is has been scored twice. The first occasion came in the match between Afghanistan and Ireland when Afghanistan scored 278/3 in the 2nd T20I of the Ireland series in India in February 2019. The Czech Republic national cricket team against Turkey during the 2019 Continental Cup scored 278/4 to equal the record. The highest score for Nepal is 238/3 scored against Netherlands during the Nepal Tri-Nation series in April 2021.

Lowest innings totals 
The lowest innings total scored was by Turkey against Czech Republic when they were dismissed for 21 during the 2019 Continental Cup. The lowest score in T20I history for Nepal is 53 scored against Ireland in the 2015 ICC World Twenty20 Qualifier.

Highest match aggregate

Lowest match aggregate

Highest win margins (by wickets)

Highest win margins (by runs)

Highest win margin (by balls remaining)

Lowest win margins (by runs)

Lowest win margin (by wickets)

Lowest win margin (by balls remaining)

Individual records

Batting records

Most career runs

Highest career average

Highest career strike rate

Highest individual score

Most fifties and over

Most centuries 
A century is a score of 100 or more runs in a single innings.

Most career sixes

Most career fours

Highest strike rate in an innings

Most runs in a calendar year

Most runs in a series

Most ducks 
A duck refers to a batsman being dismissed without scoring a run.

Individual records (bowling)

Most career wickets

Best career averages

Best economy rates

Best figures in an innings

Most four (and over) wickets in an innings

Most runs conceded in an innings

Most wickets in a calendar year

Most wickets in a series

Hat-tricks

Individual records (fielding) 
Does not include catches taken by wicket-keepers.

Most catches in career

Most dismissals in career

Individual records (other)

Most matches played in career

Most Matches played as Captain 

♣ denotes current captain.

Partnership records 
Generally in cricket, there are two batsmen who always present at the crease for batting together in a partnership. This partnership will continue until one of them is dismissed, retires or the innings comes to a close.

Highest partnerships by wicket 
In cricket, A wicket partnership describes the number of runs scored before each wicket falls. The first wicket partnership is between the opening batsmen and continues until the first wicket falls. The second wicket partnership then commences between the not out batsman and the number three batsman. This partnership continues until the second wicket falls. The third wicket partnership then commences between the not out batsman and the new batsman. This continues down to the tenth wicket partnership. When the tenth wicket has fallen, there is no batsman left to partner so the innings is closed.

Highest partnerships by runs 
The highest T20I partnership by runs for any wicket is held by the Afghani pairing of Hazratullah Zazai and Usman Ghani who put together an opening wicket partnership of 236 runs during the Ireland v Afghanistan series in India in 2019

Notes and references

See also 
Nepal national cricket team
List of Nepal Twenty20 International cricketers
List of Twenty20 International records
List of Nepal One Day International records
List of Nepal women Twenty20 international records

Cricket in Nepal
Twenty20